Fennange is a small town in the commune of Bettembourg, in southern Luxembourg.  , the town has a population of 282. Notable resident was the sculptor Maggy Stein.

Bettembourg
Towns in Luxembourg